Bommuru is a locality in Rajamahendravaram City. It is part of Greater Rajamahendravaram Municipal Corporation (GRMC).   It also forms a part of Godavari Urban Development Authority.

References 

Rajahmundry